Kalna is a small village in the Knjaževac municipality of the Zaječar District of Serbia.

Kalna is known for the only finding of uranium in Serbia. Preparations were made for the extraction of ore and the opening of a mine, but the project failed. Later, the village was subject of some controversy after allegations were made in the press in the early 1990s that the empty facilities of the doomed mine were used as a dumping place for radioactive waste from Western Europe. Despite months of high publicity in the press, these allegations were never proved to be true.
Today, the village is mainly known for being a stray dog refuge, whilst also being a place where feeding stray dogs is seen as malicious and frowned upon. The villagers are not welcoming of tourists that have intentions of helping the animals, and such groups of people are banished from the village. 

Populated places in Zaječar District